Kijevo is a village in Trnovo municipality, Istočno Sarajevo, Republika Srpska, Bosnia and Herzegovina.
Kijevo is south of Sarajevo on the road M-18 Sarajevo-Trnovo-Foča-Trebinje. 
The closest airport is Sarajevo International Airport, located 9.7 km north west of Kijevo.
The Željeznica river is one of the Kijevo's chief geographic features. It flows through the town and municipality from south through the center of Trnovo, Kijevo and Istočno (East) Sarajevo to west part of Sarajevo eventually meets up with the Bosna river.

References

External links
 Trnovo Municipality, Official Website
 Official page of City of East Sarajevo

Populated places in Trnovo, Republika Srpska
Istočno Sarajevo
Villages in Republika Srpska